Monterrey is the capital and largest city of the northeastern state of Nuevo León, Mexico.

Monterrey may also refer to:

Places

Colombia 
 Monterrey, Casanare, a town and municipality in the Casanare Department, Colombia

Mexico 
 Monterrey International Airport, Nuevo León

Spain 
 Monterrey, Orense

Peru 
 Monterrey, Ancash

Other
 related to the city of Monterrey in Nuevo León, Mexico
 Battle of Monterrey
 Club de Fútbol Monterrey, an association football  team from Monterrey, Nuevo León
 Monterrey Consensus, international agreement from the 2002 UN Monterrey Conference

See also  
 Monterey (disambiguation)
 Monterrei
 Monterrei (DO)